Donald Ray "Don" Behm (born February 13, 1945 in Vancouver, Washington) is an American wrestler and coach. He was Olympic silver medalist in Freestyle wrestling in 1968.

Career
Behm's high school career, in which he was a two time, undefeated state champion, granted him the opportunity to wrestle for Michigan State University. During his collegiate career, Behm became a two-time All-American, a two-time Big Ten champion and three-time Midlands champion. In his post collegiate freestyle career, Behm's success continued both nationally and internationally. In AAU and USWF tournaments between 1969 and 1973, he won five national championships, received All-American honors 11 times, and was twice named Outstanding Wrestler.

Representing the United States in the 1968 Olympic games, Behm earned an impressive silver medal in the first and only "no match final" in the history of the sport. In 1970, he was the first American to capture a gold medal at the grueling Tbilisi tournament, wrestling seven nine-minute matches in one day.

 1968 Silver Medal 1968 Summer Olympics
 1969 Silver Medal World Championships 57 kg
 1969 Gold Medal Pan American 
 1970 Gold Medal Tbilisi Tournament 57 kg 
 1971 Silver Medal World Championships 57 kg
 1971 Gold Medal Pan-American Games 57 kg
 1993 Gold Medal Veterans World Championships

Don Behm is a member the Illinois Athletic Hall of Fame, a charter member of the Midlands Hall of Fame. In 2004 he was inducted as a distinguished member into the National Wrestling Hall of Fame and Museum in Stillwater, OK. In 2007 he was inducted into the Greater Lansing Area Sports Hall of Fame. In 2016 he was inducted into the Michigan State University Athletics Hall of Fame. He is only the second wrestler at MSU to be included in the Athletics Hall of Fame.

References

External links

1945 births
Living people
Wrestlers at the 1968 Summer Olympics
American male sport wrestlers
Olympic silver medalists for the United States in wrestling
Sportspeople from Vancouver, Washington
Medalists at the 1968 Summer Olympics
Pan American Games medalists in wrestling
Pan American Games gold medalists for the United States
Wrestlers at the 1971 Pan American Games
Medalists at the 1971 Pan American Games
American wrestling coaches